The Maine Women's Hall of Fame was created in 1990 to honor the achievements of women associated with the U.S. state of Maine. The induction ceremonies are held each year during March, designated as Women's History Month. Nominees are chosen by the public via an online nomination form. The University of Maine at Augusta displays the hall of fame in its Bennett D. Katz Library, and also hosts the hall of fame online at the university's website. The nomination form lists three criteria for eligibility:

1) Woman's achievements must have had a significant statewide impact
2) Woman's achievements significantly improved the lives of women in Maine
3) Woman's contribution has enduring value for women.

Nominations have a December deadline of any given year.

The first two inductees in 1990 were Mabel Sine Wadsworth and Margaret Chase Smith. Wadsworth had devoted her life to multiple issues, including maternal health and family planning, founding the Wadsworth Women's Health Center. She was a member of the board of Board of Directors of Legal Services for the Elderly, and helped raise funds for noteworthy organizations.

Margaret Chase Smith was the first woman elected to serve in the United States Senate. She ran for President of the United States in the 1964 Republican Party primarily, but lost out to Barry Goldwater. She was also the first Republican to speak out against the tactics of fellow Senator Joseph McCarthy, in her June 1, 1950 address on the floor of the Senate.

Two decades after its inception, the list of Inductees contains an Olympic gold medalist, Joan Benoit, two more United States Senators, Olympia Snowe and Susan Collins, and the mother of a Senator, Patricia M. Collins who herself had been mayor of a Maine city. Geneticist Elizabeth S. Russell joined the list, as did the President University of Maine at Presque Isle Nancy H. Hensel. Author and Holocaust survivor Judith Magyar Isaacson has been honored by an induction into the hall of fame. With the 2011 inductees, the hall of fame had honored 35 women for their contributions to Maine and to the female population.

Inductees

Further reading

Citations

References

Further reading

External links
 Maine Women's Hall of Fame home page
 Marti Stevens Interactive Improvisational Theater

Women's halls of fame
Lists of American women
State halls of fame in the United States
Women's museums in the United States
Women in Maine
Halls of fame in Maine
History of women in Maine